Everton Clarke (born 24 December 1992) is a Jamaican sprinter. He represented his country in the 60 metres at the  2018 World Indoor Championships reaching the semifinals. He also was part of the Jamaican 4x100 m team to win bronze at the 2018 Commonwealth Games.

International competitions

Personal bests
Outdoor
100 metres – 10.08 (+0.4 m/s, Kingston 2016)
200 metres – 20.45 (+1.0 m/s, Kingston 2016)
Indoor
60 metres – 6.54 (Karlsruhe 2018)

References

1992 births
Living people
Jamaican male sprinters
Commonwealth Games medallists in athletics
Commonwealth Games bronze medallists for Jamaica
Athletes (track and field) at the 2018 Commonwealth Games
People from Trelawny Parish
Medallists at the 2018 Commonwealth Games